Modikwe Dikobe (pseudonym of Marks Rammitloa, born 1913, date of death is July 2005) was a South African novelist, poet, trade unionist and squatter leader in Johannesburg, in the 1940s. He wrote one book and one collection of poetry, whilst working as a hawker, clerk, domestic servant and night watchman.

Early life
Dikobe was born in Mutse village, in north-central Transvaal. When he was young his mother went to Johannesburg to work and he lived with his grandmother, looking after goats. When he was nine he moved to Sophiatown in the city to be with his mother. Then they moved to a shack in Doornfontein. He learnt to read and write, as well as being introduced to leftwing ideas, by the Communist Party’s Mayibuye night-schools in the 1930s.

Activism
His first job was selling newspapers and this is how he met his future wife, Ruth. They married in 1936 and lived in Newclare and Sophiatown, before moving to the Alexandra township. In the early 1940s, Dikobe began to organise tenants movements and bus boycotts, alongside other people such as Schreiner Baduza and James Mpanza.

Owing to the high rents, people began to squat in the veld. Dikobe joined them and became a squatter leader. He wrote for a newspaper called ‘Inkululeko’ (Freedom). The police arrested Dikobe alongside many other people in 1960. He was quickly released, but forbidden from being associated with politics or trade unions. In 1963, he took a job as a nightwatchman and began to write his book The Marabi Dance about shackdwellers in Doornfontein. Dikobe then left his wife and moved to Seabe in (modern day Mpumalanga) with another woman.

Legacy
Literary historian Tim Couzens, editor of Dikobe's volume of poetry, Dispossessed states that "Dikobe is unique in South African literature because he has been until recently [...] the only substantial writer who is, while writing, fairly strongly working class."

Works
 The Marabi Dance [novel] (1973)
 The Dispossessed [poetry](1983)

References

Further reading

Bonner, P. "The Politics of Black Squatter Movements on the Rand, 1944–1952", Radical History Review, 1990.
"The bard of township culture", Mark Gevisser, Mail & Guardian, 1995.

1913 births
Year of death missing
Housing in South Africa
South African communists
South African activists
20th-century South African poets
Shack dwellers
20th-century squatters
Squatter leaders
South African trade unionists
People from Johannesburg
South African male poets
Date of birth missing